The Zigzag Kid (also titled Nono, the Zigzag Kid) is a 2012 Dutch-Belgian family adventure film directed by Vincent Bal and starring Thomas Simon (as the title character) and Isabella Rossellini.  The film is based on the novel of the same name by David Grossman.

Plot
Nono, the son of the best police inspector in the world, would like to be like his father and for this he always ends up getting into trouble. Shortly before his Bar Mitzvah, Nono is sent to his uncle, who has been given the task of getting him back on the right path, but during the train ride he finds himself involved in an exciting adventure.

Cast
Isabella Rossellini as Lola
Thomas Simon as Nono
Burghart Klaußner as Felix
Fedja van Huêt as Jacob
Camille De Pazzis as Zohara
Jessica Zeylmaker as Gaby

Reception
Marci Schmitt of the Star Tribune gave the film four stars.  Grace Montgomery of Common Sense Media gave the film four stars out of five.  Rob Hunter of Film School Rejects gave the film a positive review, referring to it as "a fun adventure more than anything else, and it succeeds wonderfully."

References

External links
 
 

2010s English-language films
2010s French-language films
2010s Dutch-language films
2012 films
Films based on Israeli novels
Dutch adventure films
2010s adventure films
Belgian adventure films
2012 multilingual films
Belgian multilingual films
Dutch multilingual films